The 2019 European Junior and U23 Canoe Slalom Championships took place in Liptovský Mikuláš, Slovakia from 4 to 7 July 2019 under the auspices of the European Canoe Association (ECA) at the Ondrej Cibak Whitewater Slalom Course. It was the 21st edition of the competition for Juniors (U18) and the 17th edition for the Under 23 category. A total of 16 medal events took place, 8 in each of the two age categories.

Medal summary

Men

Canoe

Junior

U23

Kayak

Junior

U23

Women

Canoe

Junior

U23

Kayak

Junior

U23

Medal table

References

External links
Official website
European Canoe Association

European Junior and U23 Canoe Slalom Championships
International sports competitions hosted by Slovakia
European Junior and U23 Canoe Slalom Championships
European Junior and U23 Canoe Slalom Championships
European Junior and U23 Canoe Slalom Championships
European Junior and U23 Canoe Slalom Championships